The Esplin Islands are a group of two small islands and off-lying rocks lying northeast of Box Reef, off the south end of Adelaide Island. They were named by the UK Antarctic Place-Names Committee for Sub. Lieutenant Christopher J. Esplin Jones, Royal Navy, a member of the Royal Navy Hydrographic Survey Unit which charted this group in 1962–63.

See also 
 List of Antarctic and sub-Antarctic islands

References 

Islands of Adelaide Island